The 1991–92 Illinois Fighting Illini men's basketball team represented the University of Illinois.

Regular season
Illinois’ consecutive 20-win season streak was snapped in 1992 when the Illini posted its first losing record in 14 years, going 13-15. Despite their losing record, the Illini outscored their opponents by over 100 points during the season (1,954 - 1,843). To emphasize how close the Illini were to a successful season, of the eleven Big Ten conference games that they lost, eight were by nine points or less, of which four games were lost by three points or fewer.  Based on the allegations of recruiting violations from Iowa assistant coach Bruce Pearl, the most satisfying win during the conference season took place on February 23, 1992, when the Illini would defeat the Hawkeyes in an overtime thriller at Assembly Hall.

Roster

Source

Schedule
												
Source																
												

|-
!colspan=12 style="background:#DF4E38; color:white;"| Non-Conference regular season

	

|-
!colspan=9 style="background:#DF4E38; color:#FFFFFF;"|Big Ten regular season

|-

Player stats

Awards and honors
 Deon Thomas 
Fighting Illini All-Century team (2005)
Team Most Valuable Player

Rankings

References

Illinois Fighting Illini
Illinois Fighting Illini men's basketball seasons
1991 in sports in Illinois
1992 in sports in Illinois